This article presents the historical development and role of political parties in Ukrainian politics, and outlines more extensively the significant modern political parties since Ukraine gained independence in 1991.

Overview
Ukraine has a multi-party system with numerous political parties, in which no one party often has a chance of gaining power alone, and parties must work with each other to form coalition governments. In the (October 2014) Ukrainian parliamentary election 52 political parties nominated candidates. In the nationwide (October 2015) local elections this number had grown to 132 political parties.

Many parties in Ukraine have very small memberships and are unknown to the general public. Party membership in Ukraine is lower than 1% of the population eligible to vote (compared to an average 4.7% in the European Union). National parties currently not represented in Ukraine's national parliament Verkhovna Rada do have representatives in municipal councils. Small parties used to join in multi-party coalitions (electoral blocks) for the purpose of participating in parliamentary elections; but on November 17, 2011, the Ukrainian Parliament approved an election law that banned the participation of blocs of political parties in parliamentary elections. Ukrainian society's trust of political parties is very low overall. According to an April 2014 poll by Razumkov Centre 14.7%. According to a February 2020 poll by again Razumkov Centre, more than 70% of respondents said they rather or completely did not trust political parties.

The Ukrainian oligarchs play a key role in sponsoring of political parties and participation in every day politics.

In Ukraine, the political landscape is characterized by a lack of clear political views and aspirations among most parties. Despite running on platforms of reform, decentralization, or anti-corruption, these measures are rarely implemented at the national or regional level. Additionally, the absence of left-leaning political parties in the country places all parties within the center-right or right-wing spectrum.

Legal framework
Parties can only register with the Ministry of Justice if they can "demonstrate a base of support in two-thirds of Ukraine's Oblasts" (Ukraine's 24 primary administrative units) and in two-thirds of the raions of the Autonomous Republic of Crimea. This means that 10,000 signatures needs to be collected in these areas. Including in Crimea, although Ukraine lost control of this territory in 2014 (to Russia). (The only way to fulfill this norm is to get signatures of Ukrainian citizens living elsewhere in Ukraine with Crimean residence.) Then within six months the party must establish regional offices in a majority of the 24 oblasts. In practice these offices rarely stay active and open in-between elections. Because of the procedural difficulties of registering a party the practice of renaming existing political forces is widespread. (For instance, from January to September 2020 50 parties changed their name.) In practice this means that long career politicians in Ukraine regularly switch to a new party.

10 years in a row not nominating candidates for national parliamentary and presidential elections is a legal ground for liquidating a party.

Ukraine’s election law forbids outside financing of political parties or campaigns.

All data on any legal political parties as any other public organizations in Ukraine is kept at the Single Registry (Yedynyi reyestr hromadskykh formuvan), with online version of which provided by the Ministry of Justice. On 1 January 2020 349 political parties were in this register.

Major parties and political camps
There have developed two major movements in the Ukrainian parliament since its independence:
A pro-Western and pro-European general liberal national democrats who from time to time featured individual politicians with a nationalist past (for example Andriy Shkil, Andriy Parubiy and Levko Lukyanenko) with the Our Ukraine Blocs and Bloc Yulia Tymoshenko (now Fatherland) as its frontrunners; UDAR replaced the Our Ukraine Bloc in the 2012 Ukrainian parliamentary election. In the 2014 parliamentary election UDAR did not participate but its members filled 30% of the Petro Poroshenko Bloc election list. The Petro Poroshenko Bloc won the election with 132 seats.
A pro-Russian, latently Eurosceptic, often anti-American and partly anti-liberal group of parties, which in the 1990s was dominated by the Communist Party of Ukraine, and was dominated by the Party of Regions from the late 2000s till the party disintegrated shortly after the Revolution of Dignity.

The first movement (mentioned above) gets its voters mainly from Western Ukraine and Central Ukraine; the latter from Eastern Ukraine and Southern Ukraine.

Ideology
Ukrainian parties tend not to have a clear ideology but to contain different political groups with diverging ideological outlooks. Unlike in Western politics, civilizational and geostrategic orientations play a more important role than economic and socio-political agendas for parties. An example is the membership of the social-democratic Batkivshchyna party in the economically liberal European People's Party. This has led to coalition governments that would be unusual from a Western point of view; for example: the first Azarov government included the Party of Regions, the centrist Lytvyn Bloc and the Communist Party of Ukraine.

Particularity of parties in Ukraine
Professor Paul D'Anieri has argued (in 2006) that Ukrainian parties are "elite-based rather than mass-based," while former Ambassador of Germany to Ukraine (2000–2006) Dietmar Stüdemann from Embassy of Germany, Kyiv believes that personalities are more important in Ukrainian politics than (ideological) platforms. "Parties in the proper meaning of this word do not exist in Ukraine so far. A party for Germans is its platform first, and its personalities later."

History

Independent Ukraine, party forming (early 1990s)
Even before Ukraine became independent in August 1991, political parties in Ukraine started to form around intellectuals and former Soviet dissidents. They posed the main opposition to the ruling Communist Party (Bolsheviks) of Ukraine (CP(b)U). At the first convocation of the Verkhovna Rada those parties formed the parliamentary opposition People's Council. The most noticeable parties of the parliamentary opposition included the People's Movement of Ukraine (The Movement) and the Ukrainian Republican Party. Due to the August Putsch in Moscow (19–21 August 1991), a process to prohibit communist parties in Ukraine took place. Led by Oleksandr Moroz, the parliamentary faction of the CP(b)U, Group of 239, started a process to re-form the CP(b)U into the Socialist Party of Ukraine. The restriction on the existence of communist parties in Ukraine was successfully adopted soon after the Ukrainian independence, however in the couple of years the resolution was later challenged and eventually the restriction was lifted. In 1993 in Donetsk the first congress of the reinstated Communist Party of Ukraine took place, with the Party led by Petro Symonenko.

In the hastily organized 1994 parliamentary elections the communists surprisingly achieved the highest party rating, while the main opposing party, the Movement, did not gain even a quarter of their earned seats. The re-formed party of the CP(b)U, the Socialist Party of Ukraine, and its major ally, the Peasant Party of Ukraine, performed relatively strongly. About a third of the elected parliamentarians were not affiliated. The elections became a major fiasco of the Democratic forces in Ukraine. After the 1994 elections numerous independent political parties were elected to the Ukrainian parliament, leading to the formation of nine deputy groups and parliamentary factions: Communists, Socialists, Agrarians, Inter-regional Deputy Group (MDG), Unity, Center, Statehood, Reforms, and the Movement. The concept of a "situational majority" was first used during that convocation to form a parliamentary coalition. The ruling coalition in the parliament often included the Communist Party of Ukraine, the Socialist Party of Ukraine, Agrarians, MDG, and Unity.

Parties for oligarchs and clans (1994–2004)
During the Kuchma presidency (1994–2004) parties started to form around politicians who had achieved power; these parties were often a vehicle of Ukrainian oligarchs. Scholars defined several "Clans" in Ukrainian politics grouped around businessmen and politicians from particular Ukrainian mayor cities; the "Donetsk-clan" (Rinat Akhmetov, Viktor Yanukovich and Mykola Azarov), the "Dnipropetrovsk-clan" (Yulia Tymoshenko, Leonid Kuchma, Viktor Pinchuk, Sergey Tigipko and Pavlo Lazarenko), the "Kyiv-clan" (Viktor Medvedchuk and the brothers Surkis; this clan has also been linked to Zakarpattia) and the smaller "Kharkiv-clan".

After the 2002 elections the Ukrainian parliament saw some consolidation of democratic political parties and the establishment of the main political camps in Ukraine: a coalition of nationally oriented deputies with the pro-European vector, a coalition of left-wing parties, and the pro-Russian parties coalition of the former Soviet nomenklatura. A major change took place during the Orange revolution when finally the two opposing political camps were established after the left-wing coalition split.

Merging parties (2011-now)
On 17 November 2011 the Ukrainian Parliament approved an election law that banned the participation of blocs of political parties in parliamentary elections; since then several parties have merged with other parties. Strong Ukraine merged with the Party of Regions on 17 March 2012. Front of Changes and former Our Ukraine Bloc and Bloc Yulia Tymoshenko members performed in the 2012 parliamentary elections under "umbrella" party Fatherland. Front for Changes leader Yatsenyuk headed this election list; because Fatherland-leader Yulia Tymoshenko was imprisoned.

On 15 June 2013 Reforms and Order Party and Front for Change merged into Fatherland. A part of People’s Movement of Ukraine (including its former chairman Borys Tarasyuk) also merged with Fatherland (the rest of this party had merged with Ukrainian People's Party in May 2013).

In preparation for the upcoming 2014 parliamentary elections, several ministers of the Fatherland party in the government of Arseniy Yatsenyuk moved to the new party People's Front, which elected as its party leader Arseniy Yatsenyuk on 10 September 2014.

UDAR merged into the Petro Poroshenko Bloc on 28 August 2015 after in the 2014 parliamentary election, 30% of the Petro Poroshenko Bloc election list had been filled by members of UDAR (as non-partisan).

On 20 March 2022, President Volodymyr Zelensky announced a ban on 11 political parties for ties with Russia: Opposition Platform — For Life, Party of Shariy, Nashi, Opposition Bloc, Left Opposition, Union of Leftists, Derzhava, Progressive Socialist Party of Ukraine, Socialist Party of Ukraine, Socialists Party and Volodymyr Saldo Bloc.

Political parties in Parliament

See also
 Politics of Ukraine
 Liberalism in Ukraine

Notes

References

External links

Ukraine's party system: specifics of establishment, problems of functioning, trends of evolution, 2010 analysis by Razumkov Centre